Sero may refer to:

Places
Sero, Ethiopia, a village in Tigray Region, Ethiopia
Sero, Iran, a city in West Azerbaijan Province, Iran
Sero, Mali, a town in Sero Diamanou, Mali
Sero Blanco, a town on the island of Aruba
Sero Diamanou, a commune in Mali
Santa Cruz de la Seros, a village in the province of Huesca, Spain

People
Aghinetti (also called Guccio del Sero), Italian painter of the 14th century
Sero Khanzadyan, Armenian writer
Nicolás Mezquida Sero (b. 1992), Uruguayan football player

Other uses
Sero Hiki no Goshu (or Gauche the Cellist), Japanese anime
Şero, a celebrity cat and mascot of the Turkish Republican People's Party
The Sero, the TV from Samsung

SERO may refer to
SERO (Separating Employee Retention Offer), a Sprint PCS rate plan option for separating Sprint employees and Advantage Club subscribers 
Sports Car Endurance Race Operation 
Southeastern Regional Office, National Park Service

See also
Seròs a municipality Catalonia, Spain
 Serro (disambiguation)
 Serra (disambiguation)
Serow, a type of hoofed mammal
Cero (disambiguation)